Milton Township is one of the twelve townships of Jackson County, Ohio, United States.  As of the 2010 census, 1,028 people lived in the township.

Geography
Located in the northeastern corner of the county, it borders the following townships:
Clinton Township, Vinton County: north
Vinton Township, Vinton County: northeast
Wilkesville Township, Vinton County: east
Huntington Township, Gallia County: southeast corner
Bloomfield Township: south
Lick Township: southwest
Coal Township: west
Washington Township: northwest

Much of northwestern Milton Township is occupied by the city of Wellston, and the unincorporated community of Wainwright is located in the township's north.

Name and history
Milton Township was organized as an original township of Jackson County, and named after John Milton (1608–1674), an English poet. It is one of five Milton Townships statewide.

Government
The township is governed by a three-member board of trustees, who are elected in November of odd-numbered years to a four-year term beginning on the following January 1. Two are elected in the year after the presidential election and one is elected in the year before it. There is also an elected township fiscal officer, who serves a four-year term beginning on April 1 of the year after the election, which is held in November of the year before the presidential election. Vacancies in the fiscal officership or on the board of trustees are filled by the remaining trustees.

References

External links
County website

Townships in Jackson County, Ohio
Townships in Ohio